Vehicle glass includes windscreens, side and rear windows, and glass panel roofs on a vehicle. Side windows can be either fixed or raised and lowered by depressing a button (power window) or switch or using a hand-turned crank. The power moonroof, a transparent, retractable sunroof, may be considered as an extension of the power window concept. Some vehicles include sun blinds for rear and rear side windows. The windshield of a car is appropriate for safety and protection from debris on the road. The majority of vehicle glass is held in place by glass run channels, which also serve to contain any fragments of glass if the glass breaks.

Back glass also called rear window glass, rear windshield, or rear glass, is the piece of glass opposite the windshield in a vehicle. Back glass is made from tempered glass, also known as safety glass, and when broken will shatter into small, round pieces. This is different from a front windshield, which is made of laminated glass, glass which consists of two pieces of glass, with vinyl in between. 

This piece of glass may contain heating coils or antennae, depending on the year, make, and model of the vehicle. When broken, a back glass may be replaced by a technician to the specifications of the original glass of the vehicle

Repair 
Repairing a car glass is an environment friendly option. Though it is only limited to car windscreens as they are laminated glass and have a PVB layer to support glass on impact. Small stone chip or cracks in upper windscreen layer that have no impact on PVB or inner layer are repairable. Repair process use a specialized process and crack repair depends upon - size, position, type and depth of crack. In most cases impact up to 2 inches are repairable, crack beyond this size generally needs replacement. Yet, local laws may vary regarding safe windscreen repair. Any variation can become a reason of compromised structural integrity.

Windscreen repair require to clear the impact area and removing air through vacuum creation. A transparent fluid is used to fill the crack, the fluid is than treated with UV light to chemically transform its state to solidify and filling the crack eventually. If the repair is carried out by a professional, the clarity is restored up to 95% with complete structural integrity.

Replacement 
Vehicle glass other than windshield shatter on impact and hence need replacement. On the other hand, any impact that is more than 3 inches need replacing the windscreen. For most of the vehicle body glass i.e. Door Glass, Vent Glass are non bonded and doesn't require adhesive for installation. But windscreen, sunroof and rear window glass are generally bonded in most of the cars. They require adhesive to bond the glass with car frame. US Federal Motor Vehicle Safety Standard 212/208 ensures reliability of adhesives used in vehicle across US. For a bonded glass replacement can take up to an hour. One of the important thing that ensure a safe installation is the time require for the adhesive to cure. This is known as Safe Drive Away Time or Minimum Drive Away Time. Complete adhesive curing is necessary to ensure that your car glass can withstand any sort of impact during a mishap or accident.

See also
 Automotive head-up display
 Coachwork
 Glass
 Glass run channel
 Solar panel
 Spontaneous glass breakage
 Windshield

References

External links
Virtual widescreen

Glass